Žitná-Radiša is a village and municipality in Bánovce nad Bebravou District in the Trenčín Region of north-western Slovakia.

History
In historical records, the village was first mentioned in 1295.

Geography
Žitná-Radiša lies at an elevation of 275 meters (902 ft) and covers an area of 17.769 km²  (6.861 mi²). It has a population of about 458 people.

References

External links
 Official page
http://www.statistics.sk/mosmis/eng/run.html

Villages and municipalities in Bánovce nad Bebravou District